Days of Buffalo Bill is a 1946 American Western film directed by Thomas Carr and written by William Lively and Doris Schroeder. The film stars Sunset Carson, Peggy Stewart, Tom London, James Craven, Rex Lease and Edmund Cobb. The film was released February 2, 1946, by Republic Pictures.

Plot
Ace Diamond (James Craven) and Bill Clinker (Rex Lease) frame Sunset Carson (Sunset Carson) for the murder of a young rancher, Jim Owens (Jay Kirby as Jay Kirby). Sunset and his sidekick, Banty McCade (Tom London) escape and ride to the Owen's ranch to aid Jim's sister Molly (Peggy Stewart) in her fight to hold the ranch from being taken over by town banker Jacob Lewis (Edmund Cobb), secretly in cahoots with Diamond; both men are aware that an assay report indicates there is gold on the Owens property.

Cast  
Sunset Carson as Sunset Carson
Peggy Stewart as Molly Owens
Tom London as Banty McCabe
James Craven as Ace Diamond
Rex Lease as Bill Clinker
Edmund Cobb as Banker Jacob Lewis
Eddie Parker as Henchman Chuck Barton
Michael Sloane as Ranch hand Cam
Jay Kirby as Jim Owens
George Chesebro as Sheriff Grant
Ed Cassidy as Trail's End sheriff 
Frank O'Connor as Cashier Sam

References

External links 
 

1946 films
American Western (genre) films
1946 Western (genre) films
Republic Pictures films
Films directed by Thomas Carr
American black-and-white films
1940s English-language films
1940s American films